Durell Software is a software developer based in Taunton, Somerset in the United Kingdom. The company is a provider of back office administration and accounting software to independent financial advisers, mortgage brokers, and general insurance brokers. Durell was formerly a successful video games developer.

History

Pre-1987
Durell was founded in 1983 by Robert White. Up to 1987, Durell developed 19 games for various 8-bit computers such as Oric-1, ZX Spectrum, C64, BBC Micro, Acorn Electron and Amstrad CPC. Their biggest hit was Harrier Attack that sold over 250,000 copies.

Post-1987
Toward the end of 1987 Durell Software sold the rights to publish most of their existing games to Elite Systems and changed focus to developing financial services software for the IFA, insurance and mortgage broking industries. Currently over 1,000 advisers and brokers use Durell's software.

In 2005 Mike Richardson, author of Durell's best selling titles for the ZX Spectrum, founded Durell Games Ltd.  The first game to be developed by the company was Harrier Attack II, a sequel to their best-selling 8-bit game, which did not repeat its predecessors' success. After it, the company focused on insurance software.

Products 
Trading under the name Durell Solutions their main products are now:
 Client Facing Services
 Financial Adviser
 General Broker
 Complete Administrator

Pre-1987 games
The following is a list of games developed by Durell before it concentrated on financial services technology in the 90s.
 Galaxy 5 (1983)
 Lunar Lander / Asteroids (1983)
 Starfighter (1983)
 Scuba Dive (1983)
 Harrier Attack (1983)
 Jungle Trouble (1983)
 Lunar Landing (1984)
 Combat Lynx (1984)
 Mineshaft (1984)
 Death Pit (1985)
 Critical Mass (1985)
 Saboteur (1985)
 Deep Strike (1986)
 Fat Worm Blows a Sparky (1986)
 Thanatos (1986)
 Turbo Esprit (1986)
 Chain Reaction (1987)
 Saboteur 2 - Avenging Angel (1987)
 Sigma 7 (1987)
 Spitfire (1989)

Notes

References

External links 
 Durell

Video game companies of the United Kingdom
Video game development companies
Software companies of the United Kingdom
Software companies established in 1983
Video game companies established in 1983
Companies based in Taunton
1983 establishments in the United Kingdom
Companies established in 1983